Lycorideae are a small tribe of subfamily Amaryllidoideae (family Amaryllidaceae). They are herbaceous monocot perennial flowering plants endemic to Asia, and consisting of two genera including the type genus, Lycoris.

Taxonomy

Phylogeny 
The placement of Lycorideae within subfamily Amaryllidoideae is shown in the 
following cladogram:

Subdivision 
There are two genera:
 Lycoris
 Ungernia

References

Bibliography

External links 

Amaryllidoideae
Asparagales tribes